"You Don't Love Me" is a song by Romanian producer Sickotoy, featuring the vocals of Romanian singer Roxen. Written by Minelli and composed by Sebastian Barac, Marcel Botezan and Sickotoy, it was digitally released by Global Records on 12 August 2019 as a single. An accompanying music video directed by Raluca Netca was uploaded to YouTube on 3 September 2019. Commercially, "You Don't Love Me" attained success, reaching number three in Romania and seven in Bulgaria.

Background and release
"You Don't Love Me" was written by Minelli, while Sebastian Barac, Marcel Botezan and Sickotoy acted as composers. The track was released by Global Records for digital download and streaming on 12 August 2019 as a single. Additionally, a club edit and a remix were eventually released.

Commercial performance
Upon release, "You Don't Love Me" attained commercial success. In native Romania, the song and its music video received notable airplay on radio stations and television, leading to its peak at number three on the Airplay 100 chart. "You Don't Love Me" further charted at number seven in Bulgaria, and was playslisted by radio stations in several territories including France, United States, Russia and Spain.

Music video
An accompanying music video for the song was uploaded to Sickotoy's YouTube channel on 3 September 2019. It was directed by Raluca Netca, while Alexandru Mureșan was hired as the director of photography, Loops Production provided production and bmabid editing. The visual features Roxen residing in a club and interacting with several people; the use of strobe lightning is prominent.

Credits and personnel
Credits adapted from YouTube.
Technical and songwriting credits
Sebastian Barac – composer
Marcel Botezan – composer
Minelli – lyricist
Sickotoy – composer

Visual credits
Bmabid – editor
Alexandru Mureșan – director of photography
Loops Production – production
Raluca Netca – director

Track listing
Digital download
"You Don't Love Me" (featuring Roxen) – 3:03

Digital download (Alternative versions)
"You Don't Love Me" (featuring Roxen) [Club Edit] – 3:39
"You Don't Love Me" (featuring Roxen) [Mephisto & James Miller Remix] – 2:44

Charts

Weekly charts

Year-end charts

Release history

References

2019 songs
2019 singles
Roxen (singer) songs
Sickotoy songs
Song recordings produced by Play & Win
Songs written by Alexandru Cotoi